Güzelyurt is a village in the Adıyaman District, Adıyaman Province, Turkey. Its population is 306 (2021).

References

Villages in Adıyaman District
Kurdish settlements in Adıyaman Province